Perforatella is a genus of air-breathing land snails, terrestrial pulmonate gastropod molluscs in the subfamily Hygromiinae of the family Hygromiidae, the hairy snails and their allies.

This genus of snails is native to northeastern Europe to the Caucasus and Siberia.

Species in this genus of snails create and use love darts in their mating behavior.

Species
Species within the genus Perforatella:
 Perforatella bidentata (Gmelin, 1791)
 Perforatella dibotrion (Bielz, 1860)
 † Perforatella schileykoi Prisyazhnyuk, 1974 
Synonyms
 Perforatella incarnata (O. F. Müller, 1774): synonym of Monachoides incarnatus (O. F. Müller, 1774) (superseded generic combination)
 Perforatella rubiginosa (A. Schmidt, 1853): synonym of Pseudotrichia rubiginosa (Rossmässler, 1838)

References

  Beck, H. H. (1838). Species novarum in indice molluscorum praesentis aevi musei Principis Christiani Frederici ab autore propositarum characteres breves. Hafniae

External links
 
 Schlüter, F. (1838). Kurzgefasstes systematisches Verzeichniss meiner Conchyliensammlung nebst Andeutung aller bis jetzt von mir bei Halle gefundenen Land- und Flussconchylien. Gebauersche Buchdruckerei, Halle. vii + 40 pp
 Held, F. (1837-1838). Notizen über die Weichthiere Bayerns. Isis (Oken), 30 (4): 303-309 (1837); 30 (12): 901-919 (1838). Leipzig
  Beck, H. H. (1838). Species novarum in indice molluscorum praesentis aevi musei Principis Christiani Frederici ab autore propositarum characteres breves. Hafniae

Hygromiidae
Gastropod genera